Puka Puka (Quechua puka red, the reduplication indicates that there is a group or a complex of something, "a complex of red color", also spelled Puca Puca) is a  mountain in the Bolivian Andes. It is located in the Cochabamba Department, Arque Province, Arque Municipality.

References 

Mountains of Cochabamba Department